Oyaca may refer to:

 Oyaca, Gölbaşı
 Oyaca, Sungurlu